Tang Min (born 26 January 1971) is a Chinese-born former professional tennis player and Olympian. Tang represented both China and Hong Kong in the Fed Cup.

Early life 
On 26 January 1971, Tang was born. Tang is originally from Hunan, China.

Career 
Tang appeared in 17 Fed Cup ties for the Chinese team from 1988 to 1992. 
Tang was a member of China's bronze medal winning women's team at the 1990 Asian Games. At the 1992 Summer Olympics in Barcelona she represented China in the women's doubles, with Li Fang. The pair had a first round win over Greek qualifiers, before losing in the second round to Argentina.

By 1994, Tang was based in Hong Kong and under the guidance of Australian tennis coach Des Tyson. Tang had her best year on tour in 1995, reaching a career high ranking of 112 in the world. She was a semi-finalist at the 1995 Japan Open playing as a qualifier and later that year made the quarter-finals of the Thailand Open. It wasn't until 1997 that she debuted for the Hong Kong Fed Cup team. She played in a total of eight ties, across 1997 and 1998, while also serving as team captain.

ITF finals

Singles (6–4)

Doubles (6–5)

References

External links
 
 
 

1971 births
Living people
Hong Kong female tennis players
Tennis players from Hunan
Hong Kong people of Chinese descent
Medalists at the 1990 Asian Games
Asian Games medalists in tennis
Asian Games bronze medalists for China
Tennis players at the 1992 Summer Olympics
Olympic tennis players of China
Tennis players at the 1990 Asian Games
Chinese female tennis players